Rhopobota falcigera is a moth of the family Tortricidae first described by Alexey Diakonoff in 1950. It is found in Sri Lanka.

References

Moths of Asia
Moths described in 1950